Israel–United Arab Emirates relations had been jagged and fueled by mutual distrust and hatred for several decades, but in the 2010s, the countries' informal relations improved considerably and they began engaging in extensive unofficial cooperation based on their joint opposition to Iran's nuclear program and regional influence. In 2015, Israel opened an official diplomatic mission in Abu Dhabi to the International Renewable Energy Agency.

In a significant warming of official Israeli-UAE relations, Israel and the United Arab Emirates (UAE) formally agreed in August 2020 to "normalise" relations in a United States-brokered deal that also requires Israel to halt its plan to annex parts of the West Bank, including the Jordan Valley. A joint statement issued by the UAE, Israel and the United States said that the three countries had "agreed to the full normalization of relations between Israel and the United Arab Emirates". The signing ceremony was held on 15 September 2020.

Turkey and Iran both criticised the agreement. On 16 August 2020, the UAE for the first time established telephone links to Israel by unblocking direct dialling to Israel's +972 country code. The first direct commercial flight from Israel to the UAE was an El Al flight on 31 August 2020.

On 24 January 2021, the official Israeli embassy in the UAE was opened with Eitan Na'eh serving as an acting ambassador/Chargé d'affaires.

On 30 May 2021, the embassy of the United Arab Emirates officially opened in Tel Aviv, with Mohamed Al Khaja serving as the first ambassador of the UAE to Israel.

History
The first president of the UAE after the UAE became an independent country in 1971, Sheikh Zayed bin Sultan Al Nahyan, referred to Israel as "the enemy" of the Arab countries.

After the assassination of Mahmoud al-Mabhouh in Dubai on 19 January 2010, the UAE called, via Interpol, for the arrest of Meir Dagan, director of Israel's Mossad. Israel has neither denied nor confirmed any involvement. Dubai's Chief of police, Dhahi Khalfan Tamim, stated that all travelers suspected of being Israeli will not be allowed into the country, even if they arrived on foreign passports. After the incident, the UAE later proposed repairing its covert relationship with Israel through a deal where Israel would provide armed drones to them, but this was rejected by Israel due to concern that it would antagonize the United States.

Relations between the two countries had been improving since then.

Iran policy
After the inauguration of US President Barack Obama in 2009, the Israeli and UAE ambassadors to the United States jointly urged the incoming administration's Middle East adviser to adopt a tougher line on Iran. Obama lifted sanctions on Iran after signing the JCPOA.

In September 2012, Israeli Prime Minister Benjamin Netanyahu met with UAE Foreign Minister Abdullah bin Zayed Al Nahyan in New York City. Although they agreed on the threat of Iran, the UAE refused to publicly improve relations without progress in the Israel-Palestine peace process. In 2015, the Israeli Ambassador to the United States, Ron Dermer, briefed his UAE counterpart Yousef Al Otaiba on Israel's opposition to the Joint Comprehensive Plan of Action and urged the UAE to take a more active role in opposing the deal.

Close to the end of Obama's presidency, U.S. intelligence agencies became aware of a phone communication between the two countries' officials, including between Netanyahu and a senior UAE leader, and a meeting between Netanyahu and UAE leadership in Cyprus, which was focused on cooperation against Iran. After the election of Donald Trump as U.S. president, both Israel and the UAE lobbied for a rapprochement between the United States and Russia to contain Iranian influence in Syria.

In July 2017, the UAE mediated a meeting between Israeli intelligence and Khalifa Haftar, the head of the Libyan National Army, which is supported by the UAE in the Second Libyan Civil War, to negotiate Israeli military aid to Haftar's forces.

In March 2018, Netanyahu met with Otaiba and the Bahraini ambassador to the United States at a restaurant in Washington, D.C., where the issue of Iran was discussed.

On 10 October 2018, Dermer and Otaiba shared a table at the annual dinner of the Jewish Institute for National Security of America, where they were seen talking to one another.

Israeli visits to the UAE
On 16 January 2010, Israel's Minister of National Infrastructure Uzi Landau attended a renewable energy conference in Abu Dhabi. He was the first Israeli minister to visit Abu Dhabi.

In January 2016, Israel's Energy Minister visited the UAE at the site of International Renewable Energy Agency headquarters in Abu Dhabi.

In September 2018, the UAE hosted secret talks in Abu Dhabi between Israeli and Turkish officials to discuss restoring relations between those two countries.

In April 2019, Israel announced that it has been invited to take part at Dubai's Expo 2020 innovation fair.

On December 13, 2021, Israeli Prime Minister Naftali Bennett visited the UAE and met with Mohamed bin Zayed Al Nahyan, the Crown Prince of Abu Dhabi. This marked the first time leaders from both countries met with each other. The meeting, which included a shared lunch, went two hours longer than originally expected. Bennet stated that the meeting was about "the region, our economy and technology."

2020 Abraham Accord

On 13 August 2020, Israel and the UAE signed an agreement mediated by U.S. President Donald Trump. Under the deal, Israel and the UAE will establish full diplomatic relations, with the UAE becoming the third Arab state, besides Egypt and Jordan, to fully recognize Israel. As part of the deal, Israel agreed to suspend plans for the annexation of the Jordan Valley. Director of the Mossad, Yossi Cohen, secretly visited UAE several times for over a year to broker the Abraham Accord.

The agreement was made official with a signing ceremony on 15 September 2020 at the White House in Washington, D.C. The UAE's ambassador to the US and close adviser to Mohammed bin Zayed, Yousef Al Otaiba, was one of the main negotiators of the peace deal. Al Otaiba was one of the well-connected and powerful advocates in the US who was in contact with Jared Kushner, who was leading the peace deal negotiations. In August 2020, Al Otaiba released a statement praising the Abraham Accord as "a win for diplomacy and for the region" and stated that it "lowers tensions and creates new energy for positive change.”

The Abraham Accords revealed the rifts in the relationship between Palestine and Gulf monarchies, specially the United Arab Emirates and Bahrain. Under a 2002 Arab Peace Initiative, Arab nations declared that Israel would only receive "normal" ties in return for a statehood deal with the Palestinians and an end to the occupation. However, the Palestinian ambassador to the UK, Husam Zomlot warned that the longstanding policy had been undermined. A senior Palestinian politician, Saeb Erekat condemned the deals as a "tremendous encouragement for the Israeli government to continue their occupation". However, under the deal, Israel agreed to "suspend" annexation, but critics stated that the clause was only added as lip service to the Palestinian issue, while Israeli politicians argued that the annexation plan is still a priority.

The peace deal between the UAE and Israel was being asserted to cause damage to the United Nations Relief and Works Agency for Palestine Refugees in the Middle East (UNRWA), as the Emirates was considering to gradually eliminate aid to the agency. It was cited as a part of the normalization deal. In 2019, Abu Dhabi granted $51 million to the UN agency responsible for Palestinian refugees. The next year only $1 million were sent by the UAE.

Travel
Before the official recognition of Israel, the UAE did not allow Israeli citizens or those suspected of being Israeli citizens entry into the UAE, including Israeli passport holders, except for transit. However, third party nationals with Israeli stamps or visas in their passports were allowed entry. There were no direct flights between Israel and the UAE, so all flights had to stopover in a third, neutral country (such as Jordan), and no Israeli aircraft was allowed to enter UAE airspace. Such restrictions did not apply in Israel, though the UAE barred its citizens and aircraft from entering Israel. Restrictions were tightened against the entry of Israeli citizens following the assassination of Hamas officer Mahmoud al-Mabhouh in Dubai, which was blamed on Israeli intelligence. In 2012, Qantas teamed up with Emirates, in a deal that involved Qantas flights stopping over in Dubai on Australia-Europe flights. Concerns were raised as to how the UAE travel restrictions would impact Qantas passengers who are nationals of Israel or travelling on an Israeli passport, for example, if such passengers had to stay overnight in Dubai for a connection. Qantas cancelled the deal in 2018.

However, there are Jewish expatriates in the UAE, and there are Israelis with dual citizenship who live, visit, and work in the UAE as citizens of other countries. Prior to the normalisation of relations, some Israeli companies conducted business in the UAE indirectly through third parties.

On 31 August 2020, an El Al Boeing 737-800 (4X-EHD) made a three-hour trip from Tel Aviv to Abu Dhabi over Saudi Arabian airspace to be the first commercial flight between the two countries and the first Israeli flight to be approved to fly over Saudi Arabian airspace. With Saudi Arabia allowing Israeli flights to cross its airspace and significantly reducing operational costs as well as flight times for El Al, the airline will become more competitive on routes to India and other destinations in the Middle East and South Asia.

On 20 October 20 2020, Israel and the UAE announced a mutual visa exemption agreement, allowing Israeli citizens and Emirati citizens to go to each other's countries visa-free.

On 4 November 2020, Emirati carrier FlyDubai announced that it would start direct flights between Tel Aviv and Dubai from November 26, with tickets being offered on sale. This would mark the first commercial flight route between Dubai and Tel Aviv.

In January 2021, the visa-exemption agreement between the UAE and Israel was postponed, amidst the COVID-19 restrictions. The decision came after Israel mandated it for the Emirati travelers to quarantine as a precaution. The waiver agreement, which was supposed to be implemented on 13 February 2021, was suspended until 1 July.

On 23 June 2022, Emirates began direct flights between Dubai and Tel Aviv.

Trade
In June 2020,  a trading association, known as the  UAE-Israel Business Council (UIBC) was created by Dorian Barak, an Israeli-American investor and entrepreneur who had been working in the Persian Gulf region for the past decade, and Fleur Hassan-Nahoum, the Deputy Mayor of Jerusalem. The association consists of over 3000 businesses, business leaders, professionals and public sector leaders from the United Arab Emirates and Israel with the express purpose to foster trade, innovation and cooperation between the two countries.

The UAE-Israel Business Council mission is to build mutually beneficial relationships between Emiratis and Israelis, that advance business ties, investment, and cultural understanding. Key areas of cooperation include technology, finance, logistics and transportation, medical and biotech, agriculture, energy and water, professional services. To date there are over 250 UAE companies trading with the Israel, which is expected to rise to over 500 companies by 2021.

Policy forum
The Gulf-Israel Policy Forum was established in cooperation with the Moshe Dayan Center for Middle Eastern and African Studies at Tel Aviv University and is headed by founding member, Dan Feferman, a member of the Israeli policy research community, and Nir Boms of the Dayan Center. It includes prominent policy professionals, academics and government advisors from Israel, the UAE, Bahrain and Saudi Arabia. The policy forum acts as a hub for collaboration between policy makers and researchers in Israel and Arab states of the Persian Gulf.

The Gulf-Israel Women's Forum was established as a division of the UIBC by Fleur Hassan-Nahoum and Justine Zwerling, with the goal to unite women from the Middle East in sisterhood, culture, friendship and business. On October 9, 2020, founding members Hassan-Nahoum, Daphne Richemond-Barak and Michal Divon met in Dubai with a prominent set of Emirati women for the first of several Women's Forum events. Such events focus on involving women from Israel and the Arab world in technology, finance, healthcare, media, culture and other sectors.

Free trade agreement
On 1 April 2022, the two countries concluded negotiations for a bilateral free trade agreement, which will make 95 percent of traded products between them customs-free and will include food, agricultural and cosmetic products, and medicines and medical equipment.

Military cooperation
In August 2016, pilots from both the Israel Air Force and the UAE Air Force participated in a joint Red Flag training exercise with pilots from Pakistan and Spain, in Nevada in the United States.

In 2017, the Israel Air Force and the UAE Air Force held a joint exercise with the air forces of the U.S., Italy and Greece, in Greece, called Iniohos 2017. Another joint aerial training occurred at Iniohos 2019.

After 2011, the UAE and Israel actively participated together on the Egyptian government's side against the Sinai insurgency.

In late August 2020, reports claimed that Israel and UAE plan to establish spy bases on the Yemeni island of Socotra.

In August 2020, the UAE and Israel reached a historic Israel–United Arab Emirates peace agreement to lead towards full normalization of relations between the two countries. The agreement formally became part of the Abraham Accords involving the UAE and Israel and was signed on September 15, 2020. Security experts in Israel raised concern that the agreement was paving way for the Trump administration's proposed sale of F-35 stealth fighter jets and other sophisticated weaponry to the UAE. Israeli Prime Minister Benjamin Netanyahu opposed the sale of the fighter jets, stating that Israel's position on Middle Eastern states, acquiring such high-end weapons, did not change. The UAE Foreign Ministry spokesperson Hend al-Otaiba commented on the link between the Abraham Accord and the proposed sale of US-made F-35 fighter jets to the Emirates, by saying: "In terms of the F35s specifically, this request is not something that emerged from the current accord. Our request for the F-35 has been in process for six years now. Given that the UAE intends to be a partner to Israel, and already has a deep strategic partnership with the US, we are hopeful the request will be granted." Later in October 2020, Israel, in an apparent reference to the F-35, said that it will not oppose US sales of weapon systems to the United Arab Emirates.

The establishment of formal diplomatic relations between the two countries was said to be the result, most recently, of cooperation and talks between the UAE's National Security Adviser Tahnoun bin Zayed Al Nahyan and Yossi Cohen, the head of Israel's Mossad.

Medical cooperation
In July 2020, the Israeli Israel Aerospace Industries and Rafael Advanced Defense Systems signed an agreement with the Emirati Group 42 technology company, to offer "effective solutions" to the COVID-19 pandemic. In June 2020, the UAE's Etihad Airways landed at Ben Gurion Airport, carrying a shipment of medical supplies to assist the Palestinians during the COVID-19 pandemic. Later that month, Israel announced a partnership with the UAE to cooperate in managing the COVID-19 pandemic in their respective countries.

Cultural and scientific relations

In September 2019, the Abu Dhabi authorities announced that they would open a synagogue as part of an interfaith compound by 2022.

On 13 September 2020, UAE's Mohamed bin Zayed University of Artificial Intelligence and Israel's Weizmann Institute of Science signed a Memorandum of Understanding (MoU) to collaborate on AI research.

In January 2021, the Department of Culture and Tourism in Abu Dhabi announced the organization of the first virtual event that brings together Emirati and Israeli filmmakers on the annual "Qattara Cinema" program, under the agreement between the Abu Dhabi Film Committee, the Israeli Film Fund and Sam Spiegel School in Jerusalem, where eight Emirati and Israeli short films will be released.

Sports events

The UAE had a history of denying entry to Israelis, including for sport. However, international pressure has led to exceptions being made for athletes in international competitions. In addition, UAE athletes were prohibited from taking part in events in Israel as well as competing against Israeli athletes in any circumstance.

In February 2010, Israeli tennis player Shahar Pe'er was denied a visa by the UAE, and thus prevented from playing at the Dubai Tennis Championships. A number of players, among them Venus Williams, condemned the visa rejection, and Women's Tennis Association chief Larry Scott said that he had considered canceling the tournament, but chose not to after consulting Pe'er. Tournament director Salah Tahlak said that Pe'er was refused on the grounds that her appearance could incite anger in the Arab country, after she had already faced protests at the ASB Classic over the Gaza War. The WTA said that it would review future tournaments in Dubai. Due to the action, Tennis Channel decided not to televise the event and The Wall Street Journal dropped its sponsorship. The 2008 winner of the men's singles Andy Roddick chose not to defend his title, with prize money of over $2 million, to protest against the UAE's refusal to grant Pe'er a visa. "I really didn't agree with what went on over there. I don't know if it's the best thing to mix politics and sports, and that was probably a big part of it", Roddick said.

In October 2017, when an Israeli judoka Tal Flicker won gold in an international judo championship in the UAE, officials refused to fly the Israeli flag and play the Israeli national anthem, instead playing the official music of the International Judo Federation (IJF) and flying the IJF's logo. The UAE also banned Israeli athletes from wearing their country's symbols on uniforms, having to wear IJF uniforms. Other contestants such as Gili Cohen received similar treatment. In October 2018, the UAE reversed its position allowing the Israeli flag be displayed and anthem played when an Israeli judoka Sagi Muki won a gold medal in the Judo Grand Competition, with the Israeli Minister of Culture and Sport, Miri Regev, attending the events in Abu Dhabi.

The 2019 AFC Asian Cup held in January 2019 was another turning point. For the first time since the expulsion of Israel from the Asian Football Confederation, the UAE allowed Israeli TV channel, Sport 5, to directly broadcast the tournament held in the country. This was seen as a sign of warming relations between two nations. Sport 5 officially broadcast the opening match between the UAE and Bahrain, and had remained active until the end of the tournament. In March 2019, Israeli athletes participated in the 2019 Special Olympics World Summer Games, held in Abu Dhabi.

On 9 May 2019, the first team sporting match between Israel and the UAE took place at the Netball Europe Open Challenge at the National Sporting Centre in the Isle of Man.

In November 2019, 17-year-old Israeli Alon Leviev won the gold medal in the junior category at the Ju-jitsu World Championship, held in Abu Dhabi. In the same competition, Nimrod Ryder won another gold medal, while Ronnie Nessimian, Meshi Rosenfeld and Roy Dagan won other medals.

In September 2020, Israeli Dia Saba joined Emirati club Al-Nasr, to become the first Israeli to play in the UAE and Gulf States, following the normalization agreement.

References

 
United Arab Emirates
Bilateral relations of the United Arab Emirates